The 2018 ACC women's soccer tournament was the postseason women's soccer tournament for the Atlantic Coast Conference. The defending champions were the North Carolina Tar Heels.  However, North Carolina was unable to defend their crown, losing to Florida State in the final.

Qualification 

The top eight teams in the Atlantic Coast Conference earned a berth into the ACC Tournament. The quarterfinal round was held at campus sites, while the semifinals and final took place at Sahlen's Stadium in Cary, North Carolina.  Clemson received the 5th seed over Louisville due to having a better goal difference in conference games.  Five of the eight teams in the tournament were ranked in the United Soccer Coaches poll that was released on Tuesday, October 23, 2018.

Bracket

Schedule

Quarterfinals

Semifinals

Final

Statistics

Goalscorers 
2 goals
 Deyna Castellanos – Florida State
 Dallas Dorosy – Florida State
 Alex Kimball – North Carolina
 Kristen McFarland – Florida State

 1 goal
 Dorian Bailey – North Carolina
 Rachael Dorwart – North Carolina
 Sarah Hernandez – Louisville
 Kristina Lynch – North Carolina
 Meghan McCool – Virginia
 Zoe Morse – Virginia
 Ru Mucherera – North Carolina
 Alexa Spaanstra – Virginia
 Mariana Speckmaier – Clemson

All Tournament Team

See also 
 Atlantic Coast Conference
 2018 Atlantic Coast Conference women's soccer season
 2018 NCAA Division I women's soccer season
 2018 NCAA Division I Women's Soccer Tournament

References 

ACC Women's Soccer Tournament
2018 Atlantic Coast Conference women's soccer season